The 2002–03 season was Blackpool F.C.'s 95th season (92nd consecutive) in the Football League. They competed in the 24-team Division Two, then the third tier of English league football, finishing thirteenth.

John Murphy was the club's top scorer for the fourth consecutive season, with nineteen goals (sixteen in the league, two in the FA Cup and one in the League Trophy).

Table

References

Blackpool
2002-03